Kipper und Wipper (literally "Tipper and See-saw time") was a financial crisis during the start of the Thirty Years' War (1618–1648). Starting around 1621, city-states in the Holy Roman Empire began to heavily debase currency in order to raise revenue for the Thirty Years' War, as effective taxation did not exist. More and more mints were established until the debased metal coins were so worthless that children allegedly played with them in the street, which became the basis for Leo Tolstoy's short story "Ivan the Fool".

The name refers to the use of tipping scales to identify not-yet-debased coins, which were then taken out of circulation, melted, mixed with baser metals such as lead, copper or tin, and re-issued. Often the states did not debase their own currency, but instead manufactured low-value imitations of coins from other territories and then spent them in yet other territories as far as possible from their own lands, hoping that the resulting damage would then occur to the economy of those other regions rather than their own. This worked for a while; but after a time, the general public caught on to the manipulation, resulting in pamphlets denouncing the practice, local riots and the refusal of soldiers and mercenaries to fight unless paid in real, non-debased money. Also the states began to get back their own debased coins in taxes and customs fees. Due to these problems the practice largely stopped around 1623; however, the damage done was so large that it created financial disarray in almost all the city-states in the area. The same thing re-occurred on a smaller scale near the end of the century and again during the middle of the 18th century; however, the debasement spread from Germany to Austria, Hungary, Bohemia, and Poland.

Meaning of Kipper und Wipper 
Based on a 17th-century slang, Kipper und Wipper summarizes the financial crisis. Kipper means "the clipping of coins" and Wipper means "seesaw". During the financial crisis of Kipper und Wipper, people clipped or shaved the sides of coins. They were able to shave off the sides of coins that contained precious metals because the sides of the coins were not milled. Milled coins are coins with grooves on the sides that prevent clipping. Wipper correlates to the financial crisis because it means to wag or seesaw. While merchants or money exchangers weighted money, they would continuously keep the scale in motion so that they could switch the good money with bad, debased coins. Frequently, coins would be melted and mixed with less rare and less precious metals such as copper.

Origin of debased coins
In Europe, there were many sources of debased money. Though there is not one specific place where the debasement of coins can be traced back to, there were early traces in Italy and Switzerland. It was said that debased coins were put into circulation and were created as early as 1580.

Debasement
During Kipper und Wipper, there were two forms of debasement. To finance the Thirty Years' War, which was occurring simultaneously, coins were either shaved down or melted. By clipping or shaving coins, the amount of silver or precious metal in the coin decreased. Additionally, by melting coins, mixing them with lesser metals, making new coins, and circulating them, the nominal value, face value, greater deferred from the melt value or value of the metal in the coin.

Cause
A major decision made between cities  that resulted in the creation of more mints and eventually more debased coin was when six cities decided to allow the establishment of more mints, a place to manufacture coins and money. By doing so, mints were able to mint more debased coins.

Effect
Many states in Europe tried to finance their war efforts through debased coins. Charles P. Kindleberger wrote, "Bad money was taken by debasing states to their neighbors and exchanged for good." Referring to good money, he said that states would mint debased coins, exchange it in a neighboring state, and bring good coins back. This brought in coins that had a higher content of silver. However, the neighboring states also debased their coins to prevent a loss of money. This resulted in hyperinflation, the rapid increase of prices in a short period of time, which eventually became a crisis throughout many states in Europe as debased coins spread rapidly from state to state.

Attempt at prevention
During the period of crisis, many methods were thought of to prevent the debasement of coins and to prevent Gresham's Law, which states that coins with a lower melt value or intrinsic value circulate faster and better than coins that have a higher melt value.

In Europe, the import of bad coins and the export of good coins were enforced by punishments such as banishment, burning, or the confiscation of goods. The penalties were difficult to enforce, and debased coins and good coins flowed in and out of states.

References

External links
Kindleberger, Charles P. The Economic Crisis of 1619 to 1623. The Journal of Economic History, vol. 51, no. 1, 1991, pp. 149–175. JSTOR, www.jstor.org/stable/2123055.
"“Kipper und Wipper”: Rogue Traders, Rogue Princes, Rogue Bishops and the German Financial Meltdown of 1621–23", Mike Dash, Smithsonian, March 29, 2012
MoneyMuseum.com

1621 in the Holy Roman Empire
1622 in the Holy Roman Empire
1623 in the Holy Roman Empire
1621 in economics
1622 in economics
1623 in economics
Thirty Years' War
Economic crises in Europe
Economy of the Holy Roman Empire
Financial crises
Debased coins of Germany